Satower See is a lake in the Rostock district in Mecklenburg-Vorpommern, Germany. At an elevation of 30.1 m, its surface area is 0.068 km2.

Lakes of Mecklenburg-Western Pomerania